Timothy II may refer to:

 Pope Timothy II of Alexandria, Pope of Alexandria & Patriarch of the See of St. Mark in 454–477
 Timothy II (Nestorian Patriarch), Patriarch of the Church of the East from 1318 to ca. 1332
 Patriarch Timothy II of Constantinople, r. 1612–1620
 The Second Epistle to Timothy